Nittel is a surname of German origin. Notable people with the surname Nittel include:
 Ahren Nittel (born 1983), ice hockey player
 Heinz Nittel (1931–1981), politician

References